Sohala Na Mohra is a town in the Islamabad Capital Territory of Pakistan. It is located at 33° 30' 0N 73° 15' 15E with an altitude of 500 metres (1643 feet).

References 

Union councils of Islamabad Capital Territory